Hampen Railway Cutting is a  geological Site of Special Scientific Interest in Gloucestershire, notified in 1974. The site is listed in the 'Cotswold District' Local Plan 2001-2011 (on line) as a Key Wildlife Site (KWS) and Regionally Important Geological Site (RIGS).

Location and geology
The site lies in the Cotswold Area of Outstanding Natural Beauty and is considered one of the best exposures of the Hampen Marly Formation of the Middle Jurassic period. The exposures in the cutting show the complete section from the top of the Lower Fuller's Earth Clay to the middle of the White Limestone Formation. This is a prime research site for understanding the variations in rocks of this age between the Cotswold shelf and the Wessex area.

References

SSSI Source
 Natural England SSSI information on the citation
 Natural England SSSI information on the Hampen Railway Cutting unit

External links
 Natural England (SSSI information)

Sites of Special Scientific Interest in Gloucestershire
Sites of Special Scientific Interest notified in 1974
Cotswolds